The 2009 Big South Conference men's basketball tournament took place  March 3–7, 2009.  It was won by the Radford Highlanders.

Format
The quarterfinals were held on campus sites, with the higher seed playing host in each game. The semifinals and finals were held at the Dedmon Center in Radford, Virginia.

Bracket

References

Tournament
Big South Conference men's basketball tournament
Big South Conference men's basketball tournament
Big South Conference men's basketball tournament